Ratti is a traditional Indian unit of measurement for mass. Based on the nominal weight of a Gunja seed (Abrus precatorius), it measured approximately 1.8 or 1.75 grains or 0.11339 g as standardized weight. It is still used by the jewellers in the Indian Subcontinent.

History 

Ratti based measurement is the oldest measurement system in the Indian subcontinent, it was highly favoured because of the uniformity of its weights. The smallest weight in the Indus Valley civilization, historically called the masha, was equal to 8 rattis. The Indus weights were the multiples of masha and the 16th factor was the most common weight of 128 ratti or 13.7 g.

A unit called , literally a "hundred standard" or "hundred measures", representing 100 krishnalas is mentioned in Satapatha Brahmana. A later commentary on Katyayana Srautasutra explains that a Śatamāna could also be 100 rattis. A Satamana was used as a standard weight of silver coins of Gandhara between 600–200 BCE., rest of the Indian currency weights like Karshapanas were also based on the weight of ratti. Gold coins excavated from southeast Asia have been analysed as following the ratti based weight system as well.

During the period of Kautilya, the 32 ratti standard was called as Purana or Dharana which was in vogue before the Mauryan empire, but Kautilya provides a new standard of 80 ratti called Svarna, which was widely adopted from that time onwards. The ball weights from jeweller's hoard discovered from Taxila conform to the 32 ratti standard also called Purana by Kautilya, while the Mathura weights (Dated from 1st century BC-2nd century AD) with Brahmi numeral 100 (100 svarna or 100 karsha) conforms with the new svarna standard.

The Mughal empire employed Ratti as a unit of measure for the weight of precious stones such as diamonds. Around 1665 the Shah's son, Aurangzeb, showed a diamond to the famous jeweler and world traveler Jean Baptiste Tavernier. At that time Tavernier wrote in his Six Voyages:

Unit conversion 
Following info provides the unit conversion from ratti to other units in traditional Indian system of measurements

Mass conversion 
1 Tola = 12 Masha or 11.664 g
1 Tank = 4 Mashas or 3.888 g
1 Masha = 8 Ratti or 0.972 g
1 Ratti = 8 Rice

Currency conversion 

 1 Satamana = 100 Rattis / 11 g of pure silver
 1 Karshapana = 32 Rattis/ 3.3 g of pure silver
 ½ Karshapana = 16 Rattis
 ¼ Karshapana (masha) = 8 Rattis
 ⅛ Karshapana = 4 Rattis

Jeweller's conversion 

 4 Dhans = 1 Rati
 6 Rattis = 1 Anna
 8 Rattis = 1 Masha
 12 Mashas = 1 Tola or Bhari
 16 Annas = 1 Tola
1 Ratti (sunari) goldsmith  = 121.5 mg
1 Pakki Ratti (for astrological gemstones ) = 1.5 x Sunari Ratti = 1.5 x 121.5 mg = 182.25 mg = 0.91 Carat
1 Ratti = 0.91 carat

See also
 Rasa shastra (Ayurveda)

References

Bibliography
 
 

Units of mass
Customary units in India